In Greek mythology, Polytechnus is a carpenter from Colophon, in an Anatolian variant of the story of Tereus.

Mythology 
Polytechnus was a carpenter, and at some point he was given a gift axe by Hephaestus himself. He was married to Aëdon, the daughter of Pandareus of Ephesus. The couple had a son named Itys, and were happy until they boasted of being a more happy couple than even Zeus and Hera. The divine royal couple, slighted, sent them the goddess Eris to bring strife and discord in their home. At the time, Polytechnus was completing standing board for a chariot and Aëdon a tapestry, so they made a wager that whoever finished first would need to find the other a slave. With Hera's help, Aëdon was victorious. Polytechnus was bitter about his wife's victory, so he went to Pandareus, and lied about Aëdon sending him to fetch her sister, Chelidon. Pandareus without suspecting a thing let Polytechnus take her with him, and he raped Chelidon, cut her hair short and gave her rugs to wear, terrorising her into silence. He then gave her to Aëdon as a slave. For a time all went according to his plan, until one day Aëdon heard Chelidon lamenting her woes, and recognised her sister. Aëdon then cut her son Itys down, and served him to Polytechnus while she and Chelidon ran to their father and explained what had happened. Polytechus ran after them, but was overwhelmed by Pandareus' slaves who captured him. He was tied up, his body smeared with honey and hurled into a sheepfold as flies flocked to him. Aëdon in pity and in memory of their old love, kept the flies off of him. Her parents and brother grew angry with her, and attempted to kill her. Zeus intervened and transformed all the people involved into birds. Polytechnus became a woodpecker.

See also 

 Alcyone and Ceyx
 Haemus
 Rhodope

References

Bibliography 
 Antoninus Liberalis, The Metamorphoses of Antoninus Liberalis translated by Francis Celoria (Routledge 1992). Online version at the Topos Text Project.
 Bell, Robert E., Women of Classical Mythology: A Biographical Dictionary. ABC-Clio. 1991. .
 

Anatolian characters in Greek mythology
Metamorphoses into birds in Greek mythology
Mythological rapists
Deeds of Zeus
Deeds of Hera